The Yedigöller National Park ("seven lakes") also known as Seven Lakes National Park is located in the northern part of Bolu Province in Turkey. The park is categorized under IUCN II and was established in 1965. The park is best known for the seven lakes formed by landslides and for its profusion of plant life.

Geography

There are seven lakes in the park which were formed due to landslides. The seven lakes are Büyükgöl, Deringöl, Seringöl, Nazlıgöl, Sazlıgöl, Incegöl and Küçükgöl. Several streams flow through the park some of which have handcrafted bridges across them and a small water fall.

The park is located between Istanbul and Ankara. Access is from the Yenicaga road,  from the Ankara – Istanbul highway. During the winter the alternate road is only from the Yenicaga – Mengen – Yazicik road. Kapankaya mountain peak is within the park and provides a vantage location to view the scenic beauty of the park. It is accessible all through the year.

The park also has trekking paths and camps to stay, in the form of tents, caravans, rest houses and bungalows. There are also hot springs in the park, and the ski centers here are well known in Turkey.

The specific studies related to Saprobic values of decayed organic matter of the park indicate a range between oligosaprobic and beta-mesosaprobic status. The water quality of the streams in the park is classified as Class I and II.

Flora

The vegetation consists of beech trees, oaks, hornbeams, firs, elms, hazel nuts, spruces, alders, lime trees, black pines and Scotch pines.

Fauna
Wildlife within the park includes, but is not limited to, red deer, roe deer, wild boar, brown bears, wolves, red fox, lynx, jungle cats, otters and squirrels. As result of better protection conditions in the park the population of animals has increased. The park has an exclusive protected area for deer. A trout farm has also been established in the park. New insect species Ephemeroptera identified in the park are Ecdyonurus starmachi, Paraleptophlebia cincta, Caenis martae, and Baetis lapponicus.

Gallery

References

Bibliography

External links

Lakes of Turkey
National parks of Turkey
Landforms of Bolu Province
Tourist attractions in Bolu Province
Protected areas established in 1965